Mikhail Khutsishvili (born 28 January 1979 in Georgia) is a retired Georgian football striker who last played for Serbian SuperLiga club FK Vojvodina. He unexpectedly retired because of serious heart problems.  As of January 2016, he is the general director of FC Dinamo Tbilisi.

Career
Khutsishvili begin his career as senior with Zhineri Zhinvali moving after only a year to the Georgian giant FC Dinamo Tbilisi. He represented in this early period also several other clubs, namely Georgian FC Lokomotivi Tbilisi and FC Merani-91 Tbilisi, bur also Moldovan FC Sheriff Tiraspol.

In 1997 he played two games for Georgian U18 national team.

In 2002, he moved to Greece where he played one season with Kalamata F.C. and another half season with PAS Giannina F.C. By January 2004 he returned to Georgia this time to play with FC Torpedo Kutaisi but after six months he moved to Azerbaijan signing with FK Gäncä.

In January FC Sioni Bolnisi brought him back to Georgia what proved to be a good move since he ended up as part of Sioni's 2005–06 championship winning team. This was followed by the return to his former club FC Dinamo Tbilisi in summer 2006. He stayed with Dinamo 2 seasons winning another Georgian championship in 2007–08 and being in that same season the league topscorer.

In summer 2008 he moved to Azerbaijani FK Olimpik Baku but after only 6 months Serbian SuperLiga club FK Vojvodina offered him a contract. In summer 2009 he was joined in Vojvodina by another Georgian international footballer, Giorgi Merebashvili, but Khutsishvili started having health problems that season and after being diagnosticated with heart problems he ended abandoning his playing career in 2010.

After retiring he became as head scout of Vojvodina for 6 month. Next half year he became sports director of Dila Gori and then became general director of FC Zestafoni for four years before moving in autumn 2015 to hold the same direction position at Georgian giants FC Dinamo Tbilisi.

Honours

Club
Sioni Bolnisi
Umaglesi Liga (1): 2005–06
Dinamo Tbilisi
Umaglesi Liga (2): 1997–98, 2007–08

Individual
Umaglesi Liga Top Scorer (1): 2007–08

References

External links
 
 Mikheil Khutsishvili at Srbijafudbal.com 
 
 

1979 births
Living people
Footballers from Tbilisi
Footballers from Georgia (country)
Expatriate footballers from Georgia (country)
Association football forwards
FC Dinamo Tbilisi players
FC Lokomotivi Tbilisi players
FC Torpedo Kutaisi players
FC Sioni Bolnisi players
FC Sheriff Tiraspol players
Expatriate footballers in Moldova
Expatriate sportspeople from Georgia (country) in Moldova
Kalamata F.C. players
PAS Giannina F.C. players
Expatriate footballers in Greece
AZAL PFK players
Expatriate footballers in Azerbaijan
FK Vojvodina players
Erovnuli Liga players
Serbian SuperLiga players
Moldovan Super Liga players
Expatriate footballers in Serbia
Expatriate sportspeople from Georgia (country) in Azerbaijan